Megacraspedus escalerellus is a moth of the family Gelechiidae. It was described by Schmidt in 1941. It is found in Spain.

References

Moths described in 1941
Megacraspedus